4-Propionoxy-N,N-dimethyltryptamine (4-PrO-DMT, or O-Propionylpsilocin) is a synthetic psychedelic drug from the tryptamine family with psychedelic effects, and is theorized to act as a prodrug for psilocin. It has been sold online as a designer drug since May 2019. It was first identified as a new psychoactive substance in Sweden, in July 2019.

Recreational use

Dosage 
4-PrO-DMT is reported to be orally active, though its threshold and duration are unstudied.

Effects 
The effects of 4-PrO-DMT are broadly comparable to those of other serotonergic psychedelics such as LSD and psilocybin.

Pharmacology

Pharmacodynamics
4-PrO-DMT is theorized to be a serotonergic psychedelic, and is partial agonist of the 5-HT1D, 5-HT1B and 5-HT1A serotonin receptors.

Similar to 4-AcO-DMT, 4-PrO-DMT is believed to be a pro-drug of psilocin.

Toxicity 
Very little data about the toxicity or pharmacology of 4-PrO-DMT is known. Its chemical structure and pharmacological activity are similar to psilacetin, a compound which isn't associated with compulsive use or physical dependence. However, due to lack of research and data, it cannot be definitively concluded that its pharmacological actions in the human body do not differ from those of psilacetin. To date, there have been no reported deaths from 4-PrO-DMT.

See also 
 4-HO-DMT
 4-AcO-DMT
5-MeO-DMT
 Psilocybin

References 

Psychedelic tryptamines
Dimethylamino compounds
Entheogens
Serotonin receptor agonists
Prodrugs
Designer drugs
Esters